Sant Ravidas Ki Amar Kahani is a 1983 Indian devotional movie based on renowned saint Ravidas, directed by Babubhai Mistri, with music by Chitragupt. Ravidas (also Raidas, Rohidas and Ruhidas in eastern India) was a North Indian Sant mystic of the bhakti movement who was active in the 15th century CE. Venerated in regions including Punjab, Uttar Pradesh as well as the Indian state of Maharashtra, his devotional songs and verses made a lasting impact upon the bhakti movement. He is often given the honorific "Bhagat" or "Sant". This film was released on 1 January 1983 in the Hindi language.

Synopsis
A shoemaker of the Chamar caste, all of his devotional songs were preserved included in the Sikh holy book, the Adi Granth, by the fifth Sikh Guru, Guru Arjan Dev.[2] There is also a larger body of hymns passed on independently that is claimed and attributed by some to Ravidas ji. Ravidas was subversive in that his devotionalism implied a levelling of the social divisions of caste and gender, yet ecumenical in that it tended to promote the crossing of sectarian divides in the name of a higher spiritual unity.[3] He taught that one is distinguished not by one's caste (jāti) but by one's actions (karma) and that every person has the right to worship God and read holy texts.

Soundtrack

References

External links
 

1983 films
Indian biographical films
Ravidassia
1980s Hindi-language films
Films scored by Chitragupta
1980s biographical films
Films directed by Babubhai Mistry